Pierre Eichhorn was a Belgian sports shooter, who competed at the 1900 Summer Olympics.

At the 1900 Summer Olympics held in Paris, France, Eichhorn competed in the Men's 50 metre free pistol where he finished in 17th place out of twenty shooters, which contributed towards his team finishing fourth in the Men's 50 metre free pistol, team event.

References

External links
 

Year of birth missing
Year of death missing
Belgian male sport shooters
Olympic shooters of Belgium
Shooters at the 1900 Summer Olympics
Place of birth missing
Place of death missing